Broadcast Blues may refer to:

Broadcast Blues (documentary), a documentary film about the concentration of media ownership by corporations, FCC deregulation, and the Fairness Doctrine.  
Broadcast Blues episode of the Disney Channel comedy series Phil of the Future.